Corsaire (French for "corsair" or "pirate") may refer to:

 Le Corsaire, a ballet by Joseph Mazilier to music by Adolphe Adam et al., first performed in 1858
 Le corsaire, an overture composed by Hector Berlioz in 1844
 Le Corsaire (film), an unfinished 1939 French film
 Mauboussin M.120 Corsaire, a trainer and touring aircraft built in France beginning in the 1930s
 Corsaires de Dunkerque, a French ice hockey team

See also
 Corsair (disambiguation)